Narayana Panicker is the name of:
P. N. Panicker (Puthuvayil Narayana Panicker, 1909–1995), Indian librarian
Kavalam Narayana Panicker (1928–2016), Indian dramatist
P. K. Narayana Panicker (1930–2012), Indian religious leader
Narayana Panicker Kochupillai (born 1939), Indian doctor

See also 
K. N. Panikkar (born 1936), Indian historian